Gmina Lubin is a rural gmina (administrative district) in Lubin County, Lower Silesian Voivodeship, in south-western Poland. Its seat is the town of Lubin, although the town is not part of the territory of the gmina.

Neighbouring gminas
Gmina Lubin is bordered by the town of Lubin and the gminas of Chocianów, Chojnów, Kunice, Miłkowice, Polkowice, Prochowice, Rudna and Ścinawa.

Villages
The gmina contains the villages of Bolanów, Buczynka, Bukowna, Chróstnik, Czerniec, Dąbrowa Górna, Gogołowice, Gola, Gorzelin, Gorzyca, Karczowiska, Kłopotów, Krzeczyn Mały, Krzeczyn Wielki, Księginice, Łazek, Lisiec, Lubków, Miłoradzice, Miłosna, Miroszowice, Niemstów, Obora, Osiek, Owczary, Pieszków, Podgórze, Raszowa, Raszowa Mała, Raszówka, Siedlce, Składowice, Szklary Górne, Ustronie, Wiercień, Zalesie and Zimna Woda.

Twin towns – sister cities

Gmina Lubin is twinned with:
 Sathonay-Camp, France

References

Lubin
Lubin County